The St. James AME Church in Ashland, Kentucky is a historic African Methodist Episcopal church at 12th St. and Carter Avenue. It was built in 1912 and added to the National Register of Historic Places in 1979.

It is a gable-front brick building, with brick laid in common bond.  It is the second church of the congregation:  the first church was a wood-frame building which was moved in 1905 to the property, and which was eventually destroyed sometime after the brick building was built alongside.

References

African Methodist Episcopal churches in Kentucky
Churches on the National Register of Historic Places in Kentucky
National Register of Historic Places in Boyd County, Kentucky
Churches in Boyd County, Kentucky
Ashland, Kentucky
1912 establishments in Kentucky